The featherfin squeaker (Synodontis eupterus) or featherfin synodontis is a species of Synodontis catfish. This species is found in the basins of the White Nile, Volta and Niger Rivers and the Chad Basin. Featherfin squeakers are called such due to their ability to make noises to communicate with one another and also for their high feather-like fin which is valued by many hobbyists. Wild specimens can grow to a length of  SL.

References

Further reading
 
 
 
 

featherfin squeaker
Freshwater fish of West Africa
Freshwater fish of Cameroon
Fish of Chad
Fish of Ethiopia
Fish of Sudan
featherfin squeaker
Taxa named by George Albert Boulenger